Raúl Rico Ramírez (born April 12, 1981, in Guadalajara, Jalisco, Mexico) is a former Mexican footballer who played as a defender for Delfines.

Biography
Player from the youth squads of Querétaro, Rico has stayed most of his career on the Liga de Ascenso.

References

External links
Profile at BDFA

1981 births
Living people
Footballers from Guadalajara, Jalisco
Querétaro F.C. footballers
Irapuato F.C. footballers
C.D. Veracruz footballers
Liga MX players
Mexican footballers
Association football defenders
Central American and Caribbean Games medalists in football
Central American and Caribbean Games silver medalists for Mexico
Competitors at the 2002 Central American and Caribbean Games